The Ringnes Formation is a geologic formation in Northwest Territories. It preserves fossils dating back to the Jurassic period.

See also

 List of fossiliferous stratigraphic units in Northwest Territories

References
 

Jurassic Northwest Territories